Marchon Eyewear is a United States-based manufacturer and distributor of eyewear and sunglasses.  Founded in 1983, the company's portfolio includes several licensed brands in addition to its own house brands. The company is headquartered in Long Island, NY, and also operates offices in 18 other countries, with manufacturing in Italy, Japan, and China.

The company acquired OfficeMate Software Solutions in 1994, which produces eyecare-specific practice management software. In August 2008, the company was acquired by VSP, a major vision insurance company.

Marchon is led by President Thomas Burkhardt, who has been with the company, since 2009.

Brands 
Marchon manufactures eyeglasses under the following licensed fashion and sport brands, as well as several house brands:

Licensed Brands 
Calvin Klein
Calvin Klein Jeans
Calvin Klein Collection
Chloé
Columbia
Dragon Alliance
DVF
Etro
G-Star Raw
Karl Lagerfeld
Lacoste
Liu Jo
Longchamp (company)
MCM
Nautica
Nine West
Nike Vision
Salvatore Ferragamo S.p.A.

House Brands 
Airlock
Marchon NYC
Flexon
Skaga
Tres Jolie

References

External links 
Official website

Eyewear brands of the United States
Manufacturing companies established in 1983
Companies based in Suffolk County, New York
Eyewear companies of the United States